Boumerdès (Kabyle: Bumerdas; formerly Rocher Noir) is the capital city of Boumerdès Province, Algeria. It is located on the Mediterranean Sea. It had a population of 28,500 in 1998 and 15,000 in 1987.

Boumerdès is a seaside city located in the north of Algeria about 50 km east of Algiers and 50 km west of Tizi Ouzou. During French occupation of Algeria, the city was named Rocher Noir, translated from French as Black Rock.

It is the capital city of Wilaya (district) of Boumerdès.  The 6.8 Mw Boumerdès earthquake shook northern Algeria with a maximum Mercalli intensity of X (Extreme). More than 2,200 people were killed, over 10,000 were injured, and a moderate tsunami sank boats at the Balearic Islands. The city became the capital of the province, having the same name, according to the administrative division in 1984.

The city is famous as a scientific center, including a number of national institutes and the University of M'hamed Bouguerra. The institutes include l'Institut Algérien du Pétrole (the Algerian Petroleum Institute IAP), Faculté des Hydrocarbures et de la Chimie (Faculty of Hydrocarbons and Chemistry FHC), l'Institut National d'Électricité et d'Électronique (The National Institute for Electricity and Electronics INELEC), l'Institut National de Génie mécanique (The National Institute of Mechanical Engineering ENGM), l'Institut National des Industries légères (The National Institute for Light Industries INIL).

The city is also known as an industrial center containing the headquarters of Sonatrach Exploration, l'Entreprise Nationale de Géophysique (ENAGEO), and le Centre de Recherches et de Développement (Research and Development Center for Sonatrach CRD).

Neighbourhoods
The neighbourhoods of Boumerdès are:

Rivers

This commune is crossed by several rivers:
 Meraldene River

Geology

Several mountain peaks are found in this commune:
  (444 m)
  (420 m)

History

 First Battle of the Issers (1837)

Health

Mohamed Bouyahiaoui Hospital

Sport

Notable people

 Brahim Boushaki, Algerian theologian
 Adel Djerrar, Algerian footballer
 Mohamed Flissi, Algerian boxer
 Ali Laskri, Algerian politician
 , Algerian lawyer
 , Algerian artist
 , Algerian academic

References

External links 
 
 
 

Populated coastal places in Algeria
Populated places in Boumerdès Province
Province seats of Algeria